Jack William Radtke (April 14, 1913 in Denver, Colorado – October 24, 2006 in Twin Falls, Idaho), is a former Major League Baseball player who was an infielder for the 1936 Brooklyn Dodgers.

External links

1913 births
2006 deaths
Major League Baseball second basemen
Baseball players from Colorado
Brooklyn Dodgers players
Dayton Ducks players
Reading Brooks players
Allentown Brooks players
Williamsport Grays players
Wilkes-Barre Barons (baseball) players
Salina Millers players
Oklahoma City Indians players
Longview Cannibals players
Longview White Sox players
Waterloo Hawks (baseball) players
Boise Pilots players
Twin Falls Cowboys players
Idaho Falls Russets players